Flagstaff Medical Center is a major regional hospital and level I trauma center in Flagstaff, Arizona. The hospital was founded in 1936 by Dr. Charles Sechrist as Flagstaff Hospital, with 25 beds, and was donated to the community of Flagstaff in 1955. It is located at 1200 N. Beaver St. on the north end of the city. Today, the hospital has a staff of 190 physicians and 270 inpatient beds.

Hospital rating data
The HealthGrades website contains the latest quality data for this hospital, as of 2015. For this rating section three different types of data from HealthGrades are presented: quality ratings for 32 inpatient conditions and procedures, patient safety indicators, percentage of patients giving the hospital a 9 or 10 (the two highest possible ratings).

For inpatient conditions and procedures, there are three possible ratings: worse than expected, as expected, better than expected.  For Flagstaff Medical Center the data for this category is:
 Worse than expected – 0
 As expected – 24
 Better than expected – 8

For patient safety indicators, there are the same three possible ratings. For Flagstaff 13 indicators were rated as:
 Worse than expected – 1
 As expected – 10
 Better than expected – 2

Data for patients giving this hospital a 9 or 10 are:
 Patients rating this hospital as a 9 or 10 – 72%
 Patients rating hospitals as a 9 or 10 nationally – 69%

References

External links
 

Hospitals established in 1936
1936 establishments in Arizona
Trauma centers